1300 may refer to

 1300, events in the year 1300
 1300 (number)
 14th century, 1301–1400
 1300s decade, 1300–1309
 UTC+13:00, time zone

Telecommunications
 1–300; see Toll-free telephone number

Other
 1300 Corporals - the name for the 1300 untrained officers of Serbian Army during WWI
 Morris 1300
 1300 (group), An Australian music group